Poplin is a type of fabric.

Poplin may also refer to:

Poplin, Missouri, a ghost town in the United States
Poplin, Poland, a village in Poland